Ren Wei (born 9 April 1997) is a Chinese footballer currently playing as a midfielder for Hebei China Fortune.

Club career
Ren Wei was promoted to the senior team of Hebei China Fortune within the 2019 Chinese Super League season and would make his debut in a league game on 1 December 2019 against Wuhan Zall F.C. in a 2-1 victory.

Career statistics

References

External links

1997 births
Living people
Chinese footballers
Association football midfielders
Chinese Super League players
Hebei F.C. players